The National Youth League (NYL) is the premier competition for youth football players in New Zealand. Founded in 2003, it was a league competition consisting of the youth teams of each of the ten clubs that played in the New Zealand Football Championship. It was held each season between October and December, and consists of each team playing each other once; the fixture list mirrors that of the senior league.

The last team to be champions of the original league and the most successful team of the competition was the youth team of Auckland City, finishing champions seven times in the sixteen years the original competition ran. 

In December 2021, New Zealand Football announced that they were bringing back the National Youth Development League to run alongside the National League. The Competition will see eight teams from 3 qualifying leagues play-off in a knockout style tournament. Three teams qualify from the Northern League, three qualify from the Central League and two qualify from the Southern League.

The regional leagues will run from August through to late September. The finals series will take place at a neutral location in October and will see all eight teams play 3 games in a knockout style competition.

Auckland United are the defending champions after winning the 2022 edition.

History

The first National Youth League was founded in 2003, with eight teams representing different regional football federations in New Zealand, playing each other once; the inaugural champions were Capital Soccer.

In 2007, the competition changed from teams representing federations to teams representing each club in the New Zealand Football Championship. The youth squad of Auckland City won the first season of this new format, and have since become the most successful team in the competition, winning six titles.

In 2008, the competition used a ten-team, two-group format, with the top two teams from each group heading into a playoff system; Waitakere United won in the final against Canterbury United. However, in 2009, only four teams participated due to funding issues (Auckland City, Waitakere United, Auckland-Manukau and Hawke's Bay United); the league moved to nine teams in late 2010 following the league's rebrand to the ASB Premiership, still following the two-group format.

The 2013 season introduced two more teams to make a twelve-team, two-group league, but in 2014 the format was amended to mirror the New Zealand Football Championship; each league team fielded a youth team in the National Youth league, with the competitions returning to its one-group format.

In the 2016 season, mirroring the club movements of the New Zealand Football Championship, Hamilton Wanderers replaced the outgoing WaiBOP United and both newly founded teams Tasman United and Eastern Suburbs fielded sides in the competition. Surprisingly, Hamilton Wanderers won the title at their first attempt under the leadership of first-team players Michael Built and Adam Luque.

After a review by New Zealand Football of all their national competitions, it was decided to end the national youth competition. Instead each club from the New Zealand Football Championship will have to register 40 players, of which 17 of them have to be aged 21 or under. They will also work with the local federations the clubs are assigned with, to run a development team in the regional leagues.

In the last season of the old competition, Auckland City won its seventh title as well as winning three in a row from 2017 to 2019 to finish as Champions of the competition.

In 2021, New Zealand Football announced the reintroduction of the National Youth League as an U-17 competition that will run alongside the National League.

Current teams

Former teams

Champions
{|
|-
|style="vertical-align:top;width:28%"|

References

Association football leagues in New Zealand
Youth football competitions